Gagnepain is a French surname. Notable people with the surname include:

 François Gagnepain (1866–1952), French botanist
 Jean Gagnepain (1923–2006), French linguist and anthropologist
 Xavier Gagnepain (born 1960), French cellist

French-language surnames